All in a Night's Work is the ninth studio album by the funk and disco group KC and the Sunshine Band. The album was produced by Harry Wayne Casey and Richard Finch and was released in August 1982 on the Epic label.

History
All in a Night's Work sparked a brief return to success for the band, including the hit track "Give It Up", which became a number 1 hit in the UK and Ireland, and reached number 18 on the pop charts in the United States.

Track listing

Personnel
Harry Wayne Casey – keyboards, vocal
Steven Gordon – guitar
James Magnole – guitar
Richard Finch – bass guitar, drum, percussion
Gary King – bass, background vocals
Fermin Goytisolo – percussion
Jimmy "Bo" Horne – percussion
Ken Wadenpfuhl – french horn
Bill Reichenbach Jr. – trombone
Christine Nield – flute
Neil Bonsanti – oboe
Whit Sidener – bass clarinet
Gary Herbig – saxophone
Stacey Berkley – harp
Deborah Carter – background vocals
Beverly Champion – background vocals
Denise King – background vocals

References

External links
 All in a Night's Work at Discogs

KC and the Sunshine Band albums
1982 albums
Epic Records albums